Brigadier General Charles FitzClarence  (8 May 1865 – 12 November 1914) was an Anglo-Irish recipient of the Victoria Cross, the highest and most prestigious award for gallantry in the face of the enemy that can be awarded to British and Commonwealth forces.

Early life
Charles FitzClarence was born in County Kildare, the son of Captain George FitzClarence (15 April 1836 – 24 March 1894) and Maria Henrietta Scott (1841 – 27 July 1912). He had a twin brother named Edward. His paternal grandfather was The 1st Earl of Munster, an illegitimate son of William, Duke of Clarence (later King William IV of the United Kingdom).  He joined the Royal Fusiliers in 1886 but his early career was blighted by several bouts of illness and he spent much of his time in administrative and staff roles. In 1899 he volunteered to serve as a Special Service Officer at Mafeking, South Africa and was given the duty of training a squadron of the Protectorate Regiment.

The VC action
FitzClarence was 34 years old, and a captain in The Royal Fusiliers, British Army, during the Second Boer War when the following deeds took place for which he was awarded the Victoria Cross:

His ferocity in battle earned him the enduring nickname 'The Demon'. He served in South Africa until February 1901, at which point he transferred to the newly formed Irish Guards. He passed Staff College in January 1903, and succeeded to the command of the 1st Battalion Irish Guards in July 1909. He had a reputation as a forward thinking soldier and took an innovative, albeit demanding, approach to training. It was noted he was "both loved and feared by his battalion". At the outbreak of the First World War, he was promoted to the rank of brigadier general and was given command of the newly formed 29th Brigade.

The Great War 
On 27 September 1914 he replaced Brigadier-General Ivor Maxse as commander of 1st Guards' Brigade with the British Expeditionary Force. He held this command until he was killed in action on 12 November 1914.

On 4 October 1914, whilst 1st Guards' Brigade was holding trenches opposite the German line at the River Aisne, he ordered the Coldstream Guards to carry out a night time raid against a German position known as 'Fish Hook Trench'. This was the first British trench raid of the First World War. The raid was led by Second Lieutenant Merton Beckwith-Smith and was a striking local success.

In October, FitzClarence had played a significant part in the First Battle of Ypres. Captain Valentine Williams, MC, writing in Blackwood's Magazine, described the action at Gheluvelt thus: "The Coldstream and Scots Guards' battalions of FitzClarence's brigade, in trenches north of Gheluvelt, suffered terribly in a German attack, delivered in a dense mist on the morning of the 27th along the Menin road. The odds against the British were crushing, for on that day some 24,000 Germans were arrayed against about 5,000 exhausted British troops. In two days the Scots Guards lost 10 officers and 370 men killed and wounded. But the result of the day's fighting was that the British line stood firm and unbroken, while the Germans had sustained enormous losses". Sir John French, in his Despatch published on 30 November 1914, described the fighting at this time as: "Perhaps the most important and decisive attack (except that of the Prussian Guard on the 10th November) made against the 1st Corps during the whole of its arduous experiences in the neighbourhood of Ypres."

Blackwood's Magazine for August 1917 carries an article describing FitzClarence's part. It was he who gave the order for the vital counter-attack of 31 October 1914. He "rallied the troops and directed the successful onslaught". Lt Col. E. B. Hankey, involved in the attack, said of FitzClarence: " ... by shoving us in at the time and place he did, the General saved the day."

On the morning of 11 November, the Prussian Guard attacked British troops along the Menin Road. Thirteen battalions of them came on, but only in three places did the Prussian Guard break through. On the following morning FitzClarence counter-attacked. The General himself decided to show his old regiment the way, and paid for the decision with his life. FitzClarence fell dead, and neither FitzClarence himself, nor Sir John French knew how well he had served his country at Gheluvelt.

In his Despatch of 20 November 1914, Sir John French said: "Another officer whose name was particularly mentioned to me was Brigadier-General FitzClarence, VC, commanding the 1st Guards' Brigade. He was unfortunately killed in the night attack of the 11th November. His loss will be severely felt".

His most recent biographer, Spencer Jones, describes FitzClarence as exemplifying "...the best aspects of the post-Boer War [British] officer class" due to his "courage, professionalism, natural leadership, and willingness to act upon his own initiative."

He was killed in action, aged 49, at Polygon Wood, Zonnebeke, Belgium, on 12 November 1914 whilst commanding the 1st (Guards) Brigade.

He is the highest-ranking officer inscribed on the Menin Gate Memorial in Ypres, commemorating those with no known grave.

The medal
His VC is in the Lord Ashcroft VC Gallery in the Imperial War Museum, London.

Family
On 20 April 1898, at the Citadel Church, Cairo, he married Violet Spencer-Churchill (13 June 1864 – 22 December 1941), daughter of Lord Alfred Spencer-Churchill and a granddaughter of the sixth Duke of Marlborough. The couple had two children:
 Edward Charles FitzClarence, 6th Earl of Munster (3 October 1899 – 15 November 1983)
 Joan Harriet FitzClarence (23 December 1901 – 6 January 1971)

Notes

References
Listed in order of publication year 
The Register of the Victoria Cross (1981, 1988 and 1997)

List of Irish Victoria Cross recipients (Dept of Economic Development 1995)
Monuments to Courage (David Harvey, 1999)
Irish Winners of the Victoria Cross (Richard Doherty & David Truesdale, 2000)
"Elegant Extracts" – The Royal Fusiliers Recipients of the VC (J. P. Kelleher, 2001)
Royal Fusiliers Recipients of the Victoria Cross
Turtle Bunbury, The Glorious Madness, Tales of The Irish and The Great War,  Charles FitzClarence—Kildare's Royal VC Winner, p. 37, Gill & Macmillan, Dublin 12 (2014) 
Spencer Jones (ed.) Stemming the Tide: Officers and Leadership in the British Expeditionary Force 1914.  Helion & Co. (2013)

External links

 
 angloboerwar.com

1865 births
1914 deaths
Military personnel from County Kildare
British Army brigadiers
Graduates of the Staff College, Camberley
19th-century Anglo-Irish people
20th-century Anglo-Irish people
People from County Kildare
Charles FitzClarence
Second Boer War recipients of the Victoria Cross
British recipients of the Victoria Cross
Irish recipients of the Victoria Cross
British Army generals of World War I
Royal Fusiliers officers
Irish Guards officers
Irish officers in the British Army
British military personnel killed in World War I
British Army personnel of the Second Boer War
People educated at Eton College
People educated at Wellington College, Berkshire
British Army personnel of the Mahdist War
Irish twins
British twins
British Army recipients of the Victoria Cross